F1 2016 is a racing game which is based on the 2016 Formula One season and was developed by Codemasters Birmingham, published by Codemasters, distributed by Deep Silver in North America and Ubisoft in Japan. The game was released on 19 August for PlayStation 4, Xbox One and Windows. The game was also released for iOS, Android and tvOS on 10 November. A Mac version by Feral Interactive was released on 6 April 2017.

Features
Players are able to play a revised career mode consisting of ten full seasons rather than five seasons in previous games. The game included the twenty-one circuits from the 2016 season and in-game commentary from David Croft and Anthony Davidson. The game also featured all eleven teams and twenty-two drivers competing in the championship, including the return of Renault, and the brand-new Haas team. Esteban Ocon was however not included, as he did not replace Rio Haryanto until the game's pre-release development had ended.

Players were also able to choose the time of day that a race takes place, customise helmet designs and choose a race number for career mode. The safety car returned, with the mechanics related to it revised, while the Virtual Safety Car was introduced, as well as manual starts, manual pit lane entry and (for the first time in a Codemasters game) the formation lap. The research and development aspect of the game was revised to allow players a greater degree of control over the performance of the car. The teams have a perception of the player, which decreases with bad results and increases with good results. The player will be fired or demoted if the perception goes too low, and will be promoted if the perception goes too high. Online lobbies are expanded to allow for twenty-two car grids.

Reception

The game received a positive reception scoring 86 out of 100 on the review aggregator site Metacritic, with many publications calling it the best Formula One game Codemasters has created.

The game reached number 2 in the UK PS4 sales chart, behind No Man's Sky, but topped the XO chart.

The mobile version, however, has a score of only 66/100 on Metacritic due to AI issues.

References 

2016 video games
Android (operating system) games
Codemasters games
Ego (game engine) games
F1 (video game series)
IOS games
MacOS games
PlayStation 4 games
Racing video games
Square Enix games
Ubisoft games
Video games scored by Mark Knight
Video games set in Australia
Video games set in Austria
Video games set in Azerbaijan
Video games set in Bahrain
Video games set in Belgium
Video games set in Brazil
Video games set in Canada
Video games set in China
Video games set in Hungary
Video games set in Italy
Video games set in Japan
Video games set in Malaysia
Video games set in Mexico
Video games set in Monaco
Video games set in Russia
Video games set in Singapore
Video games set in Spain
Video games set in Texas
Video games set in the United Arab Emirates
Video games set in the United Kingdom
Windows games
Xbox One games
Multiplayer and single-player video games
Video games developed in the United Kingdom
Feral Interactive games